Luty is a surname. Notable people with this surname include:

 Fritz Luty, American physicist
 Gotlieb Luty (1842–1904), American soldier
 Mateusz Luty (born 1990), Polish bobsledder
 Paul Luty (1932–1985), English wrestler
 Philip Luty (1965–2011), English author, activist, and gunsmith